Emily's Wonder Lab is an educational streaming television series starring Mason Wells, Sky Alexis, Zaela Rae, Kennedi Butler and Makenzie Lee-Foster, with Emily Calandrelli as host. It premiered on August 25, 2020 on Netflix. On July 13, 2021, the series was canceled after just one season.

Cast 
 Emily Calandrelli
 Mason Wells
 Sky Alexis
 Kennedi Butler
 Makenzie Lee-Foster
 Arya Darbahani
 Zaela Rae
 Alex Jayne Go
 Tenz McCall

Episodes

Release 
Emily's Wonder Lab was released on August 25, 2020, on Netflix.

References

External links 
 
 

2020s American children's television series
2020 American television series debuts
American preschool education television series
2020s preschool education television series
English-language Netflix original programming
Netflix children's programming
Television shows set in West Virginia
Television series by Bunim/Murray Productions
Science education television series